The Smyrna Church Habo is a church building in Habo, Sweden. It belongs the Evangelical Free Church in Sweden and was inaugurated on First Advent Sunday 1975.

References

External links
official website 

20th-century churches in Sweden
Churches in Habo Municipality
Habo
Churches completed in 1975
1975 establishments in Sweden